The American Academy of Dermatology (AAD) is a non-profit professional organization of dermatologists in the United States and Canada, based in Rosemont, Illinois, near Chicago. It was founded in 1938 and has more than 20,500 members. The Academy grants fellowships and associate memberships, as well as fellowships for nonresidents of the United States or Canada. Since 1979, the AAD also publishes a monthly medical journal, the Journal of the American Academy of Dermatology.

To become a Fellow of the American Academy of Dermatology (FAAD), a physician must be a resident of the United States of America or Canada and certified by the American Board of Dermatology or in dermatology by the Royal College of Physicians and Surgeons of Canada.

To become an associate member, a physician must have three years of experience in practice or as a teacher or graduate student of dermatology and must have had training that qualifies for examination by the American Board of Dermatology or the Royal College of Physicians and Surgeons of Canada.

History 
In 1938, the American Academy of Dermatology and Syphilology was founded at an organizational meeting at the Statler Hotel in Detroit, Michigan.

Sulzberger Institute Committee 
The Sulzberger Institute for Dermatologic Education was a grant-giving organization that funds research technology of education.  Initially, the Sulzberger was a free-standing institute loosely affiliated with the AAD and governed by an independent board of trustees.  Since 2005, the Sulzberger has been subsumed within the AAD, and has become the Sulzberger Institute Committee of the AAD.

Each fall, the Sulzberger awards one or two seed grants for research designed to improve the teaching of dermatology via novel technological applications.  In recent years, the Committee has been particularly interested in funding research to advance continuing graduate medical education in dermatology and the teaching of dermatologic surgery.  Grants are typically for one to two years, and are targeted to young investigators, including junior faculty and residents-in-training.

Political action committee
The American Academy of Dermatology Political Action Committee (SKINPAC) donated nearly $1.3 million to both Democratic and Republican office-seekers during the 2016 election cycle. The PAC raised more than $1.4 million from 1,700 donors, who gave more than $200 each, with 49 donors, mostly dermatologists, making the maximum donation allowed by law, $5,000 each.

SKINPAC gave:
 $325,000 to House Democrats
 $390,500 to House Republicans
 $32,500 to Senate Democrats
 $120,00 to Senate Republicans
 $182,500 to Democratic PACs
 $239,000 to Republican PACs.

Donations in the 2016 cycle were slightly down (6.6%) from the 2014 cycle. The PAC spent an additional $29,900 with the Mammen Group, a DC-based direct mail agency and $28,800 with Prevail Strategies, a political consulting and public affairs company.

References

External links

 

Medical associations based in the United States
Dermatology organizations
Organizations established in 1938
1938 establishments in the United States
Medical and health organizations based in Washington, D.C.